Paczkowo may refer to the following places in Poland:
Paczkowo, Greater Poland Voivodeship (west-central Poland)
Paczkowo, Pomeranian Voivodeship (north Poland)
Pączkowo, Masovian Voivodeship (east-central Poland)